The Interton Video 2501 is a dedicated first-generation home video game console that was released by Interton in 1977. It is the successor of the Interton Video 2400 and the predecessor of the Interton Video 2800. It can output the games in color.

References 

First-generation video game consoles
Dedicated consoles
1970s toys
Video games developed in Germany